Front Page Sports was a series of video games created by Sierra On-Line.

Front Page Sports Baseball
Front Page Sports Football
Front Page Sports: Golf

Sierra Entertainment games
Sports video games